The Austro-Hungarian 8×50mmR Mannlicher or 8×50mmR M93 is a service cartridge dating back to the days of semi-smokeless powder. It was later replaced by (and many weapons were rechambered for) the 8×56mmR cartridge.

History

M90
In approximately 1890, the Austro-Hungarian Empire converted the older, black powder filled 8×52mmR Mannlicher round into a semi-smokeless cartridge, following upon the heels of France's 8 mm Lebel cartridge, the first smokeless military round. This new round was designated 8mm M.1890 scharfe Patrone or "nitro-Patrone". It was loaded with the same 244 gr bullet but carried a 43 gr charge of "Gewehrpulver" ("rifle powder", Austria-Hungary's name for their version of smokeless powder, which was actually a "semi-smokeless" powder).

M93
In 1893 the loading was once again updated with the perfection of a completely smokeless powder by the Austro-Hungarians. This new loading was designated "8mm M.1893 scharfe Patrone", it was loaded with the same bullet as the two previous loadings but used a 43 gr charge of the new Gewehrpulver M.1892. This improved ballistics slightly to  out of the M.88/90 and later M.95 long rifles, it was about  less out of the repetier-carabiner M.90 and M.95.

Current use 

The IOF.315 Sporting Rifle uses this cartridge under the title of .315 (also .315 Indian). 

The 8×50mmR Mannlicher cartridge has a long history of sporting use in India, as it was a simple matter to modify the Lee–Enfield action to accommodate the 8×50mmR in place of the .303 inch cartridge, thus providing a solution to the British colonial administration's 1907 ban on civilians possessing rifles chambered in British military calibres while offering a cartridge of similar capabilities.

British gunmakers BSA produced sporting versions of the Lee–Enfield military rifle, chambered in "8mm (.315")" from well before World War I until at least the 1930s.  The British-founded "Rifle Factory Ishapore" continues to manufacture Lee–Enfield sporting rifles in this chambering.

Handloading 

Reloadable cartridge cases can be produced by reforming and trimming 8×56mmR Mannlicher or 7.62×54mmR Mosin–Nagant Russian brass.  Standard .323" 8mm S-bullets are correct for this caliber though best results are obtained from open-base bullets that can expand to fit the .329" bore. RCBS offers both reforming and reloading dies.

When reloading for "wedge-lock" Mannlicher rifles such as the M.88, M.86/88, M.86/90 or M.88/90 chamber pressures should be kept low for safety.  Rifles such as the Mannlicher M.95 using a stronger rotating-bolt design can be loaded to higher pressures.

References

 
Military cartridges
Pistol and rifle cartridges
Rimmed cartridges
Weapons and ammunition introduced in 1890